Mallosia, described by Étienne Mulsant in 1847, is a genus of longhorn beetles of the subfamily Lamiinae, tribe Saperdini. It is distributed in the Palearctic, from Greece to Caucasus and Iran.

Distribution
The genus includes:
 subgenus Mallosia Mulsant, 1863
 species Mallosia graeca (Sturm, 1843)
 subgenus Micromallosia Pic, 1900 
 species Mallosia heinzorum Holzschuh, 1991
 species Mallosia heydeni (Ganglbauer, 1888)
 species Mallosia theresae (Pic, 1900)
 subgenus Anatomallosia Özdikmen & Aytar, 2012
 species Mallosia nonnigra Özdikmen & Aytar, 2012
 subgenus Eumallosia Danilevsky, 1990
 species Mallosia armeniaca Pic, 1897
 species Mallosia brevipes Pic, 1897
 species Mallosia costata Pic, 1898
 species Mallosia herminae Reitter, 1890
 species Mallosia imperatrix Abeille de Perrin, 1885
 subgenus Eusemnosia Özdikmen & Aytar, 2012
 species Mallosia baiocchii (Sama, 2000)
 species Mallosia interrupta Pic, 1905
 species Mallosia mirabilis Faldermann, 1837
 species Mallosia tristis Reitter, 1888
 subgenus Submallosia Özdikmen & Aytar, 2012
 species Mallosia jakowlewi Semenov, 1895
 species Mallosia tamashaczi Sama & Székely, 2010
 subgenus Semnosia K. Daniel, 1904
 species Mallosia galinae Danilevsky, 1990
 species Mallosia scovitzii (Faldermann, 1837)

References

Saperdini
Cerambycidae genera